Phahon Yothin station is a Bangkok MRT station on the Blue Line located under Lat Phrao Road, near Lat Phrao Square. The station is important for people who live in Northern Bangkok such as Don Mueang, Lak Si and Bang Khen District. Its symbol color is  yellow., and connect to the BTS Sukhumvit Line at Ha Yaek Lat Phrao station.

References 

MRT (Bangkok) stations
Railway stations opened in 2004
2004 establishments in Thailand